Kaolan Kaovichit born May 12, 1978, is a Thai former kickboxer. He was the runner up of K-1 World Max 2002.

Biography
Kaolan Kaovichit was born in Songkhla Province, Thailand on May 12, 1978, as Jahormat Miyundichar.

Titles and accomplishments
Lumpinee Stadium
 2003 Lumpinee Stadium Welterweight Champion -66.8 kg
 1999 Lumpinee Stadium Lightweight Champion -61 kg
 1996 Lumpinee Stadium Super Bantamweight Champion -55.5 kg

K-1
 2002 K-1 World MAX Final runner up -70 kg

World Muay Thai Council
 2001 W.M.C Welterweight World Champion  

Awards
 2001 Sports Writers Association of Thailand Fight of the Year (vs Namsaknoi Yudthagarngamtorn)
 1998 Sports Writers Association of Thailand Fighter of the Year

Fight record

|-
|-  bgcolor="#FFBBBB"
| 2006-07-02 || Loss ||align=left| Tatsuya Ishiguro || N.J.K.F. "Advance VI -Muay Thai Open- || Tokyo, Japan || KO (Punches) || 1 || 2:33
|-
|-  bgcolor="#FFBBBB"
| 2004-04-17 || Loss ||align=left| Masaaki Kato || Muaythailumpineekrikkri Fights, Lumpinee Stadium || Bangkok, Thailand || KO (Knee Strikes) || 2 ||
|-
! style=background:white colspan=9 |
|-
|-  bgcolor="#FFBBBB"
| 2003-08-17 || Loss ||align=left| Yoshihiro Sato || A.J.K.F. "All Japan Kickboxing 2003 Hurricane Blow" || Tokyo, Japan || Decision (Unanimous) || 5 || 3:00
|-
! style=background:white colspan=9 |
|-
|-  bgcolor="#c5d2ea"
| 2003-07-20 || Draw ||align=left| Takahiko Shimizu || AJKF "All Japan Kickboxing 2003 Kick Out" || Bunkyo, Tokyo, Japan || Decision (1-0) || 5 || 3:00
|-
|-  bgcolor="#CCFFCC"
| 2003-03-08 || Win ||align=left| Pajonsuk Lukprabat || Lumpinee Stadium || Bangkok, Thailand || Decision (Unanimous) || 5 || 3:00
|-
! style=background:white colspan=9 |
|-
|-  bgcolor="#FFBBBB"
| 2002-07-20 || Loss ||align=left| Pajonsuk luprabat || Lumpinee stadium || Bangkok, Thailand || Decision (Unanimous) || 5 || 3:00
|-
! style=background:white colspan=9 |
|-
|-  bgcolor="#FFBBBB"
| 2002-05-11 || Loss ||align=left| Albert Kraus || K-1 World MAX '02 Final, Final || Tokyo, Japan  || KO (Left Hook) || 1 || 1:00
|-
! style=background:white colspan=9 |
|-
|-  bgcolor="#CCFFCC"
| 2002-05-11 || Win ||align=left| Takayuki Kohiruimaki || K-1 World MAX '02 Final, Semi Finals || Tokyo, Japan || KO (Knee Strikes) || 2 || 2:42
|-
|-  bgcolor="#CCFFCC"
| 2002-05-11 || Win ||align=left| Zhang Jiapo || K-1 World MAX '02 Final, Quarter Finals || Tokyo, Japan || Decision (Unanimous) || 3 || 3:00
|-
|-  bgcolor=""
| 2002-02-27 || ||align=left| Muhammad Faisan || Rangsit market || Rangsit, Thailand || Decision  || 5 || 3:00
|-  bgcolor="#fbb"
| 2001-12-04 || Loss||align=left| Namsaknoi Yudthagarngamtorn || Lumpinee Stadium || Bangkok, Thailand || Decision  || 5 || 3:00
|-  bgcolor="#cfc"
| 2001-08-02 || Win ||align=left| Pajonsuk Lukprabat || Lumpinee Stadium || Bangkok, Thailand || Decision  || 5 || 3:00
|-  bgcolor="#CCFFCC"
| 2001-06-24 || Win ||align=left| Pajonsuk Lukprabat || Muay Thai - The World Heritage || Bangkok, Thailand || Decision (Unanimous) || 5 || 3:00
|-
! style=background:white colspan=9 |
|-  bgcolor="#fbb"
| 2001-04-21 || Loss||align=left| Morad Sari || Les Gladiateurs du Millenium || Paris France || Decision  || 3 || 3:00
|-
|-  bgcolor="#CCFFCC"
| 2000-12-05 || Win ||align=left| Dany Bill || King's Birthday || Bangkok, Thailand || Decision (Unanimous) || 5 || 3:00
|-
|-  bgcolor="#CCFFCC"
| 2000-08-04 || Win ||align=left| Depitak ISS || Lumpinee Stadium || Bangkok, Thailand || Decision (Unanimous) || 5 || 3:00
|-
|-  bgcolor="#CCFFCC"
| 2000-07-08 || Win ||align=left| Ahmed Mayouf || ISKA Kickboxing || Las Vegas, Nevada, USA || Decision (Unanimous) || 5 || 3:00
|-
|-  bgcolor="#CCFFCC"
| 2000 || Win ||align=left| Khunsuk Sitpooramate ||  || Phetchaburi Province, Thailand || Decision (Unanimous) || 5 || 3:00
|-
|-  bgcolor="#CCFFCC"
| 2000 || Win ||align=left| Orono Por Muang Ubon || Lumpinee Stadium || Bangkok, Thailand || Decision  || 5 || 3:00
|-
|-  bgcolor="#FFBBBB"
| 2000-04-25 || Loss ||align=left| Namsaknoi Yudthagarngamtorn || Lumpinee Stadium || Bangkok, Thailand || Decision (Unanimous) || 5 || 3:00
|-
! style=background:white colspan=9 |
|-  bgcolor="#FFBBBB"
| 1999- || Loss ||align=left| Khunsuk Phetsupaphan ||  || Petchaburi, Thailand || Decision || 5 || 3:00
|-  bgcolor="#FFBBBB"
| 1999- || Loss ||align=left| Khunsuk Phetsupaphan || Lumpinee Stadium || Bangkok, Thailand || Decision || 5 || 3:00
|-
|-  bgcolor="#FFBBBB"
| 1999-08-10 || Loss ||align=left| Khunsuk Phetsupaphan || Lumpinee Stadium || Bangkok, Thailand || KO || 4 ||
|-
! style=background:white colspan=9 |
|- style="background:#cfc;"
| 1999-05-11 || Win ||align=left| Samkor Chor.Rathchatasupak ||  Lumpinee Stadium || Bangkok, Thailand || Decision || 5 || 3:00
|- style="background:#cfc;"
| 1999-03-26 || Win ||align=left| Samkor Chor.Rathchatasupak ||  Lumpinee Stadium || Bangkok, Thailand || Decision || 5 || 3:00
|-
! style=background:white colspan=9 |
|- style="background:#cfc;"
| 1999-02-10 || Win ||align=left| Therdkiat Kiatrungroj|| Lumpinee Stadium || Bangkok, Thailand || Decision ||5 ||3:00
|- style="background:#cfc;"
| 1998-12-08 || Win||align=left| Namkabuan Nongkeepahuyuth || Lumpinee Stadium || Bangkok, Thailand  || Decision || 5 || 3:00
|- style="background:#cfc;"
| 1998-10-30 || Win ||align=left| Lamnamoon Sor.Sumalee ||  Lumpinee Stadium || Bangkok, Thailand || Decision || 5 || 3:00
|-  bgcolor="#cfc"
| 1998-09-11 || Win ||align=left| Rambojiew Por Thubtim || Lumpinee Stadium || Bangkok, Thailand || Decision || 5 || 3:00
|-  bgcolor="#fbb"
| 1998-05-26 || Loss ||align=left| Rambojiew Por Thubtim || Lumpinee Stadium || Bangkok, Thailand || Decision || 5 || 3:00
|-  bgcolor="#c5d2ea"
| 1998-03-03 || Draw||align=left| Bakjo Sor.Pannut || Lumpinee Stadium || Bangkok, Thailand || Decision || 5 || 3:00

|-  bgcolor="#FFBBBB"
| 1997-09-13 || Loss ||align=left| Samkor Chor.Rathchatasupak || Lumpinee Stadium || Bangkok, Thailand || Decision  || 5 || 3:00
|-  bgcolor="#fbb"
| 1997-05-23 || Loss ||align=left| Ritthichai Lukjaopordam|| Lumpinee Stadium || Bangkok, Thailand || KO || 4 || 
|-
! style=background:white colspan=9 |
|-  bgcolor="#cfc"
| 1997-03-28 || Win||align=left| Daoudon Sor.Suchart|| Lumpinee Stadium || Bangkok, Thailand || Decision || 5 || 3:00
|-  bgcolor="#cfc"
| 1997-02-25 || Win||align=left|  Sot Looknongyangtoy	|| Lumpinee Stadium || Bangkok, Thailand || Decision || 5 || 3:00
|-  bgcolor="#fbb"
| 1996-11-29 || Loss ||align=left| Nungubon Sitlerchai || Lumpinee Stadium || Bangkok, Thailand || KO (Punches) || 2 ||
|-  bgcolor="#cfc"
| 1996-09-24 || Win||align=left| || Lumpinee Stadium || Bangkok, Thailand ||  ||  || 
|-
! style=background:white colspan=9 |
|- style="background:#cfc;"
| 1996-03-26 || Win ||align=left| Nuengpichit Sityodtong ||  Lumpinee Stadium || Bangkok, Thailand || Decision || 5 || 3:00
|-
|-
| colspan=9 | Legend:

References

External links 
k-1sport.de Profile

1978 births
Living people
Bantamweight kickboxers
Featherweight kickboxers
Lightweight kickboxers
Welterweight kickboxers
Kaolan Kaovichit
Kaolan Kaovichit